Haiti is a country located on the island of Hispaniola in the Greater Antilles archipelago of the Caribbean Sea. Haiti's purchasing power parity GDP fell 8% in 2010 (from US$12.15 billion to US$11.18 billion) and the GDP per capita remained unchanged at PPP US$1,200. Despite having a viable tourist industry, They may have converted into a public company (like listed with the Haitian Stock Exchange), or have seen a decline in sales, or at worst gone into an insolvency procedure, been sold, broken up, or liquidated. Haiti is one of the world's poorest countries and the poorest in the Americas region, with poverty, corruption, poor infrastructure, lack of health care and lack of education cited as the main sources. The economy receded due to the 2010 earthquake and subsequent outbreak of Cholera. Haiti ranked 145 of 182 countries in the 2010 United Nations Human Development Index, with 57.3% of the population being deprived in at least three of the HDI's poverty measures.

For further information on the types of business entities in this country and their abbreviations, see "Business entities in Haiti".

Notable firms 
This list includes notable companies with primary headquarters located in the country. The industry and sector follow the Industry Classification Benchmark taxonomy. Organizations which have ceased operations are included and noted as defunct.

References 

 
Haiti